is a Japanese voice actor. He is affiliated with Across Entertainment.

Filmography

Television animation
Sumomomo Momomo (2006) (Takao)
The Tower of Druaga (2008) (Touge)
Needless (2009) (Kafuka)
Little Battlers Experience (2011-13) (Junichirō Yamano)
Battle Spirits: Sword Eyes (2012) (Stinger)
Jormungand: Perfect Order (2012) (Plame)
JoJo's Bizarre Adventure: Stardust Crusaders (2014–15) (Jean Pierre Polnareff)
Magica Wars (2014) (Sōta Hayami)
The Idolmaster Cinderella Girls (2015) (Manager Imanishi)
Aikatsu Stars! (2016) (Masaru Nijino)
All Out!! (2016) (Toshinosuke Matsuo)
18if (2017) (Ehyeh)
JoJo's Bizarre Adventure: Golden Wind (2019) (Jean Pierre Polnareff)
Great Pretender (2020) (Sam Ibrahim)
Tropical-Rouge! Pretty Cure (2021) (Butler)
Vinland Saga Season 2 (2023) (Snake)
Synduality (2023) (Mouton)

OVA
Mobile Suit Gundam Unicorn (2011) (Tomura)
Mobile Suit Gundam: The Origin (2016) (William Kemp)

Theatrical animation
Mobile Suit Gundam 00 the Movie: A Wakening of the Trailblazer (Presidential Aide)
Inazuma Eleven GO vs. Danbōru Senki W (Junichirō Yamano)
A Silent Voice (Takeuchi)

Video games
JoJo's Bizarre Adventure: Eyes of Heaven (Jean Pierre Polnareff)
Resident Evil 2 (Marvin Branagh)
JoJo's Bizarre Adventure: Last Survivor (Jean Pierre Polnareff)
Resident Evil 3 (Marvin Branagh)
JoJo's Bizarre Adventure: All Star Battle R (Jean Pierre Polnareff)
Tactics Ogre: Reborn (Martym Noumous)

Puppetry
Sherlock Holmes (Jabez Wilson, Abdullah)

Dubbing

Live-action
Shia LaBeouf
Transformers (Sam Witwicky)
Transformers: Revenge of the Fallen (Sam Witwicky)
Lawless (Jack Bondurant)
Transformers: Dark of the Moon (Sam Witwicky)
Fury (Boyd "Bible" Swan)
Man Down (Gabriel Drummer)
The Peanut Butter Falcon (Tyler)
The Tax Collector (Creeper)
Kellan Lutz
Immortals (Poseidon)
The Legend of Hercules (Hercules)
Extraction (Harry Turner)
12 Monkeys (James Cole (Aaron Stanford))
The 5th Wave (Evan Walker (Alex Roe))
A Divisão (Mendonça (Silvio Guindane))
Ain't Them Bodies Saints (Bob Muldoon (Casey Affleck))
All of Us Are Dead (Song Jae-ik (Lee Kyu-hyung))
American Pie Presents: The Book of Love (Rob Shearson (Bug Hall))
Armored (Dobbs (Skeet Ulrich))
Avengers: Age of Ultron (Quicksilver/Pietro Maximoff (Aaron Taylor-Johnson))
Baggage Claim (William Wright (Derek Luke))
The Bank Job (Dave Shilling (Daniel Mays))
Blood & Treasure (Danny McNamara (Matt Barr))
Captain Phillips (Najee (Faysal Ahmed))
Clerks (Dante Hicks (Brian O'Halloran))
The Cloverfield Paradox (Michael Hamilton (Roger Davies))
Crazy Rich Asians, Nicholas "Nick" Young (Henry Golding)
CSI: Cyber (Elijah Mundo (James Van Der Beek))
Dark Blood (Boy (River Phoenix))
Das Boot (Klaus Hoffmann (Rick Okon))
Deep Blue Sea 3 (Richard Lowell (Nathaniel Buzolic))
Devil's Due (Zach McCall (Zach Gilford))
Eagle Eye (Major William Bowman (Anthony Mackie))
Empire State (Chris Potamitis (Liam Hemsworth))
The Exorcist (Father Tomas Ortega (Alfonso Herrera))
The Expendables 3 (Thorn (Glen Powell))
Fanboys (Harold Hutchinson (Dan Fogler))
Faster (Killer (Oliver Jackson-Cohen))
The Fifth Estate (Daniel Domscheit-Berg (Daniel Brühl))
Firewall (Vel (Kett Turton))
Fright Night (Mark (Dave Franco))
G.I. Joe: The Rise of Cobra (Conrad S. Hauser / Duke (Channing Tatum))
G.I. Joe: Retaliation (Conrad S. Hauser / Duke (Channing Tatum))
Gamer (Simon Silverton (Logan Lerman))
The Gilded Age (Tom Raikes (Thomas Cocquerel))
Glory Road (Bobby Joe Hill (Derek Luke))
Godzilla (Ford Brody (Aaron Taylor-Johnson))
Gossip Girl (Rufus Humphrey (Matthew Settle))
Harry Potter and the Deathly Hallows – Part 1 (Cormac McLaggen (Freddie Stroma))
Hawaii Five-0 (Ben Bass (Josh Dallas))
In Time (Henry "Hank" Hamilton (Matt Bomer))
Ingrid Goes West (Dan Pinto (O'Shea Jackson Jr.))
Instant Family (Pete Wagner (Mark Wahlberg))
Interstellar (Doyle (Wes Bentley))
Jay and Silent Bob Strike Back (Netflix edition) (Silent Bob (Kevin Smith), Dante Hicks (Brian O'Halloran))
The King's Letters (Buddhist monk Shinmi (Park Hae-il))
Lake Placid: Legacy (Sam (Tim Rozon))
Last Christmas (Tom Webster (Henry Golding))
The Legend of 1900 (2020 Blu-Ray edition) (Max Tooney (Pruitt Taylor Vince))
Legion (Jeep Hanson (Lucas Black))
Léon: The Professional (2009 Blu-Ray edition) (Mathilda's Taxi Driver (Abdul Hassan Sharif))
Lockout (Hydell (Joe Gilgun))
The Lord of the Rings: The Rings of Power (Arondir (Ismael Cruz Córdova))
Love, Simon (Jack Spier (Josh Duhamel))
Million Dollar Arm (Rinku Singh (Suraj Sharma))
Moonlight (Chiron (Trevante Rhodes and Ashton Sanders))
Mud (Mud (Matthew McConaughey))
My Soul to Take (Brandon O'Neil (Nick Lashaway))
Need for Speed (Finn (Rami Malek))
New Year's Eve (Paul (Zac Efron))
No Strings Attached (Adam Franklin (Ashton Kutcher))
Old (Guy Cappa (Gael García Bernal))
Only the Brave (Jesse Steed (James Badge Dale))
The Other Side of Hope (Khaled Ali (Sherwan Haji))
Out of the Furnace (Rodney Baze Jr. (Casey Affleck))
Pandorum (Manh (Cung Le))
Paranoia (Adam Cassidy (Liam Hemsworth))
Paranormal Activity 3 (Dennis (Christopher Nicholas Smith))
Parkland (Dr. Charles James "Jim" Carrico (Zac Efron))
Passengers (Jim Preston (Chris Pratt))
Pompeii (Milo (Kit Harington))
Project Almanac (David Raskin (Jonny Weston))
Red Riding Hood (Peter (Shiloh Fernandez))
Red Sparrow (Nate Nash (Joel Edgerton))
The Resident (Conrad Hawkins (Matt Czuchry))
Safe House (2018 BS Japan edition) (Keller (Joel Kinnaman))
Sense8 (Will Gorski (Brian J. Smith))
Slumdog Millionaire (Jamal Malik (Dev Patel))
The Social Network (Eduardo Saverin (Andrew Garfield))
Star Wars: The Force Awakens (Poe Dameron (Oscar Isaac))
Step Up Revolution (Sean Asa (Ryan Guzman))
Step Up: All In (Sean Asa (Ryan Guzman))
The Swordsman (Tae-yul (Jang Hyuk))
Tenet (Ives (Aaron Taylor-Johnson))
Terminator: Dark Fate (Rev-9 (Gabriel Luna))
The Texas Chain Saw Massacre (Kirk (William Vail))
This Is Us (Kevin Pearson (Justin Hartley))
Thor (Fandral (Josh Dallas))
Till Death (Mark (Eoin Macken))
Trance (Dominic (Matt Cross))
Trespass (Jonah (Cam Gigandet))
Triple 9 (Chris Allen (Casey Affleck))
Tropic Thunder (Alpa Chino (Brandon T. Jackson))
Trouble with the Curve (Johnny Flanagan (Justin Timberlake))
U.F.O. (Michael Galloway (Sean Brosnan))
Under the Silver Lake (Sam (Andrew Garfield))
Vacancy (The Killer (Scott Anderson))
The Wall (Sergeant Allen Isaac (Aaron Taylor-Johnson))
Warm Bodies (Perry Kelvin (Dave Franco))

Animation
Bee Movie (Adam Flayman)
Ben 10: Alien Force (Jetray, Big Chill, DNAliens)
Jelly Jamm (King)
Lightyear (Airman Diaz)
Milo Murphy's Law (Title character)
Monsters University ("Frightening" Frank McCay)
ParaNorman (Mitch Downe)
Ron's Gone Wrong (Graham Pudowski)
Sausage Party (Frank Wienerton)
Star Wars Resistance (Poe Dameron)
Tad, The Lost Explorer (Tad Stone)

Video games
Halo 4 (2012) (Lasky)
Assassin's Creed IV: Black Flag (2013) (Adewale)
Batman: Arkham Knight (2015) (Tim Drake)

References

External links
 Fuminori Komatsu at Across Entertainment 
 

1978 births
Japanese male video game actors
Japanese male voice actors
Living people
Male voice actors from Tokyo
21st-century Japanese male actors
Across Entertainment voice actors